Sunita Narain (born 1961) is an Indian environmentalist and political activist as well as a major proponent of the Green concept of sustainable development. Narain is director general of the India-based research institute for the Centre for Science and Environment, director of the Society for Environmental Communications, and editor of the fortnightly magazine, Down To Earth.

In 2016 Narain was named on Time Magazine'''s list of 100 Most Influential People. She appeared alongside Leonardo DiCaprio in the documentary Before The Flood (2016), discussing the impact of climate change on the Monsoon in India and how it affects farmers. 

Early life
Sunita Narain was born in 1961 in New Delhi, and was the oldest of four sisters. Her father Raj Narain, who died when Narain was 8, had been a freedom fighter, and then established a handicrafts business. Her mother, Usha Narain, took over the business and raised the siblings. The income from the business provided the family with a comfortable lifestyle. In 1979, Sunita Narain joined the student anti-logging activist group Kalpavriksh. she told Marcello Rossi of the Smithsonian magazine that this gave her a new direction in life, as she realised that "the crux weren't the trees, but the rights of people over those trees". She completed her graduation by correspondence from University of Delhi (1980–83).

Career

Narain began working with the Centre for Science and Environment, one of India's first environmental Non-governmental organizations whilst still a student at the University of Delhi, working with the founder Anil Agarwal. Narain became the Deputy Director of the CSE in 1993, and was appointed as the Director in 2000.

Narain, following the scientific consensus on climate change, attributes blame for the climate crisis to the fossil-fuel based economies of Western countries, and advocates that India should seek an alternative route to economic growth. Under her leadership, Centre for Science and Environment exposed the high level of pesticides present in American brands of soft drinks such as Coke and Pepsi.

In 2012, she wrote the 7th State of India's Environment Reports, Excreta Matters, an analysis of urban India's water supply and pollution.

In 2016 Narain was named on Time Magazine's list of 100 Most Influential People. Novellist Amitav Ghosh wrote for Time that "A paper that she co-authored in 1991 remains to this day the foundational charter of the global climate-justice movement ... Narain has also consistently opposed the kind of elite conservationism that blames environmental problems on the poor."

Narain appeared alongside Leonardo DiCaprio in the documentary Before The Flood (2016) and talked about the impact of climate change on the Monsoon in India and how it affects farmers.

In 2008 Narain delivered the K R Narayanan Oration on "Why Environmentalism Needs Equity: Learning from the environmentalism of the poor to build our common future". In 2020, she served on "A future for the world's children?", a WHO-UNICEF-Lancet Commission, co-chaired by Helen Clark and Awa Coll-Seck.

In 2021,Narain was surveyed by TIME magazine.They conducted a survey amongst a variety of international experts to determine which potential interventions are most feasible and highest priority when attempting to stop a future pandemic. Narain expressed concern about the lack of priority for measures such as protecting ecosystems and modifying food habits.Narain cites environmental issues such as factory farming, air pollution, lack of access to proper sanitation and clean water as potential triggers for an increased spread of infectious diseases. 

Personal life
Narain was injured in a traffic collision while cycling near the All India Institute of Medical Sciences on the morning of 20 October 2013. Her bicycle was hit by a car while she was cycling to Lodhi Gardens from her home in Green Park. The car driver did not stop and Narain was taken to AIIMS by a passerby. She sustained facial wounds and orthopaedic injuries. She was discharged 11 days later, after having reconstructive surgery on her nose, and two metal rods implanted to support her broken wrists.

Awards
In 2004, Narain received the Chameli Devi Jain Award for Outstanding Women Mediaperson, for " for bringing environmental issues to the mainstream". The following year, she was awarded the Padma Shri by the Government of India. and the Centre for Science and Environment, under her leadership, was awarded the Stockholm Water Prize.

She was granted an honorary Doctor of Science by the University of Calcutta in 2009. and as conferred with the Raja-Lakshmi Award for the same year from Sri Raja-Lakshmi Foundation, Chennai. In 2016, Narain was named on Time Magazine's list of 100 Most Influential People, and received the International Association for Media and Communication Research Climate Change Communication Research in Action Award She was an Edinburgh Medal recipient in 2020. Narain has also been awarded honorary doctorates by the University of Lausanne, and the University of Alberta.

PublicationsTowards Green Villages (1989)Global Warming in an Unequal World: A case of environmental colonialism (1990)Towards a Green World: Should environmental management be built on legal conventions or human rights? (1992)Green Politics: Global Environmental NegotiationsDying Wisdom: Rise, Fall and Potential of India's Water Harvesting Systems.State of India's Environment, Volume 4, Anil Agarwal, Sunita Narain, Centre for Science and Environment (1997)The State of India's Environment, The Citizens' Fifth ReportMaking Water Everybody's Business: the practice and policy of water harvesting.Maggie Black, New Internationalist (1 October 2007)Conflicts of interest: my journey through India’s Green Movement (Penguin Random House India, 2017) was praised by reviewer Runa Sarker as "an excellent record of [Narain and the CSE's] efforts and the outcomes, and how it has shaped policy", although what Sarker felt that in some respects the book failed to address the complexities involved, and that how "the conflicts of interest deeper and wider than projected" in the book.
 Recovery of tigers in India: Critical introspection and potential lessons.
References

External links
 
 
 Indian Environmentalist Sunita Narain on US Climate Policy - video report by Democracy Now!''

Living people
Recipients of the Padma Shri in other fields
Indian environmentalists
Indian women environmentalists
1961 births
Activists from Delhi
Indian political writers
Indian women political writers
20th-century Indian women writers
Writers from Delhi
20th-century Indian journalists
Indian editors
Indian women editors
21st-century Indian women writers
21st-century Indian journalists
Women writers from Delhi
Journalists from Delhi